Colorado State Highway 1 (SH 1) is a  state highway in Larimer County, Colorado, United States, that runs from U.S. Route 287 (US 287) / Colorado State Highway 14 (SH 14), just north of the city line of Fort Collins, northeast to Interstate 25 (I-25) / U.S. Route 87 (US 87) in Wellington.

Route description

The road passes through an area of the Colorado Piedmont between Fort Collins and Wellington. It furnishes the principal road connection between those two communities and passes through a primarily suburban region north of Fort Collins, along the east side of Terry Lake, where it becomes Terry Lake Drive. Heading northward, it passes south of Waverly and the WWV radio towers, both visible from the road. In Wellington, it becomes Cleveland Avenue, a readily used route in that town. Although the area running aside the road was traditionally agricultural, it has been the site of rapid housing growth in recent years, particularly near Wellington.

History
The route was numbered in 1923. During that time, it followed US 85 from New Mexico to I-25, continuing north along US 85 to Denver, and began as various roads throughout the city that merged. It then paralleled the current route of US 287 towards Fort Collins, then along its current alignment from Fort Collins to Wellington. From Wellington, it followed various roads back to the current I-25, where it continued north and terminated at the Wyoming border. By 1938, the entire route was paved as part of a major project. In 1954, a section north of Fort Collins was removed, leaving only the portion south of that point. In 1957, the portion north of Fort Collins was returned to the route. However, the entire portion from Fort Collins to the New Mexico border was closed in 1968. Since then, the routing has not significantly changed.

Major intersections

See also

 List of state highways in Colorado
 List of highways numbered 1

References

External links

001
Transportation in Larimer County, Colorado
Fort Collins, Colorado